A mythological king is an archetype in mythology. A king is considered a "mythological king" if he is included and described in the culture's mythology.  Unlike a fictional king, aspects of their lives may have been real and legendary, or that the culture (through legend and story telling) believed to be real.  In the myth, the legends that surround any historical truth might have evolved into symbols of "kinship" and leadership, and expanded with descriptions of spiritual, supernatural or magical chain of events. For example, in legend the king may have magical weapons and fight dragons or other mythological beasts. His archetypical role is usually to protect and serve the people.

Archetypes of kings
One mythological archetype is the "good king" (McConnel 1979), also sometimes called the "monarchical hero". The "good king" is often the epic hero who made his world safe for civilization.  Two examples that scholars have identified as filling the roles and earning the reputation of "good kings" were King Arthur and Beowulf, above and beyond their legendary and historic lives.

Beowulf for example is a mythological king in training in the epic tradition, because he fights "a strenuous battle against the disorganization of the universe." (McConnel 1979:59) Another is the great king "Oxthar", a leopard headed man that journeyed to the mythical underworld of Palulu (which is the supposed place where the sun goes to rest at night) and stole glowing stones from the bed of the sun to give light and power to his people.

Mythemes of kings
Some mythemes and cultural belief systems that are explored through myths about kings include: what is the source of the king's power, what is the training he must go through, what tests of courage does he pass, what are the battles he must fight, and what are the effects of taking power.

In epics of war,  source of power is often having physical skills above ordinary men, owning "magical" weapons and political alliances.

In spiritual mythologies the king's power may come from a spiritual source and also spiritual weapons. In romantic and contemplative myths his power and success may from internal personality traits, such as from courage, wisdom and self-restraint.

Another common theme is the king's wounds, sacrifice and (sometimes) death for the betterment of the people. The Fisher King is an example of theme of the "wounded king."

One other theme to be aware of in storytelling and mythology is that the king's health is often symbolic of the health of the kingdom or society: For example, a sick king means a weakened and vulnerable society, a healthy king means a healthy society,  an emotionally or physically distant king means the society is in danger. Also, the installation of kings at the New Year was believed to renew the cosmos: "The king becomes in a manner responsible for the stability, the fecundity and the prosperity of the entire Cosmos." (Eliade 1963:41)

See also
 List of legendary kings of Britain
 List of legendary kings of Denmark
 List of legendary kings of Norway
 List of legendary kings of Scotland
 List of legendary kings of Sweden
 Kayanian dynasty, legendary kings from Iran
 Great King
 Sacred king
 Great Catholic Monarch
 Katechon - Eschatological King
 Golden Bough
 King in the Mountain
 King Arthur's messianic return
 Kings' sagas
 Saga

References

 Eliade, Mircea (translated). Myths and Reality. Translated from French by Trask, William, edited by Ruth Nanda Anshen. New York: Harper and Row, 1963. (esp. Section III "Myths and Rites of Renewal"; Section IX "Survivals and Camaflages of Myths - Eschatological Myths of the Middle Ages")
 McConnell, Frank. Storytelling and Mythmaking. New York, Oxford: Oxford University Press, 1979  . (Discusses the different types of mythological kings)

King
 
Stock characters